Beaver Harbour is a harbour or bay on northern Vancouver Island, British Columbia, Canada, located to the east of the town of Port Hardy.  Beaver Harbour Provincial Park was located on the west side of the bay but was transferred to local governance in 1970.

History and name origin
Spanish commanders Galiano and Valdez conferred the name Puerto de Guemes after the Viceroy of Mexico.  The harbour was labelled "Daedalus Harbour" on an 1850 sketch by a Mr. Dillon of the Royal Navy, after ; the name "Beaver Harbour" first appeared on Lieutenant Mansell's 1851 plan of the harbour.

See also
Beaver Harbour (disambiguation)
Beaver (disambiguation)

References

Ports and harbours of British Columbia
Bays of British Columbia
Northern Vancouver Island